This is a timeline documenting events of Jazz in the year 1999.

Events

January

March
 26 – The 26th Vossajazz started in Voss, Norway (March 26 – 28).

May
 13 – The 27th Nattjazz started in Bergen, Norway (May 13 – 29).
 21 – The 28th Moers Festival started in Moers, Germany (May 21 – 24).

June
 30 – The 35th Kongsberg Jazzfestival started in Kongsberg, Norway (June 30 – July 3).

July
 1 – The 20th Montreal International Jazz Festival started in Montreal, Quebec, Canada (July 1 – 11).
 2 – The 9th Jazz Fest Wien started in Wien, Austria (July 2 – 10).
 3 – The 33rd Montreux Jazz Festival started in Montreux, Switzerland (July 3 – 18).
 10
 The 24th North Sea Jazz Festival started in The Hague (July 10 – 12).
 The 34th Pori Jazz started in Pori, Finland (July 10 – 19).
 11 – The 52nd Nice Jazz Festival started in Nice, France (July 11 – 18).
 12 – The 39th Moldejazz started in Molde, Norway (July 12 – 17).
 21 – The 34th San Sebastian Jazz Festival started in San Sebastian, Spain (July 22 – 27).

August
 9 – The 14th Oslo Jazzfestival started in Oslo, Norway (August 9 – 15).
 11 – The 13th Sildajazz started in Haugesund, Norway (August 11 – 15).
 13 – The 16th Brecon Jazz Festival started in Brecon, Wales (August 13 – 15).

September
 17 – The 42nd Monterey Jazz Festival started in Monterey, California (September 17 – 19).

Unknown date
"Don't Know Why" by Jesse Harris appears on his 1999 album, Jesse Harris & the Ferdinandos.
The Magic City Jazz Orchestra (MCJO) American jazz ensemble is founded.
The Pulitzer Prize Board bestows a special posthumous honor on Duke Ellington.
WEAA is named 1999 Jazz Station of the Year by Gavin magazine.
Atomic, Norwegian / Swedish jazz band formed.
Radioactive Sago Project, a Filipino jazz rock band formed in Quezon City, Metro Manila, Philippines.
III Records, a record label based in Japan is founded.
Zoe Rahman, British jazz composer and pianist, won the "Perrier Young Jazz Musician of the Year" Award.

Album releases

July

With Wikipedia articles
 1999 Remixes, the third compilation album released by British acid jazz band Jamiroquai
 April Kisses, by Bucky Pizzarelli
 Contemporary Jazz, by the Branford Marsalis Quartet
 Continuance, by jazz fusion band Greetings From Mercury, recorded live at Vooruit, Ghent, Belgium
 Live at the Floating Jazz Festival, from the 1997 jazz festival of the same name by violinist Johnny Frigo and his quartet.
 Peculiar Situation, a smooth jazz studio album by Earl Klugh
 Synergy, studio album by jazz-fusion group Dave Weckl Band
 Time's Mirror, big band album by jazz trumpeter, composer and arranger, Tom Harrell
 Without Kuryokhin, American jazz multi-instrumentalist Kenny Millions and Japanese experimental musician Otomo Yoshihide.
 Barefoot on the Beach, by American smooth jazz vocalist Michael Franks.

Other
Jane Ira Bloom: The Red Quartets
Steve Coleman: The Sonic Language of Myth – Believing Learning Knowing
Marty Ehrlich: Malinke's Dance
Bill Dixon: Papyrus I
Guillermo Gregorio: Red Cubed
Paul Dunmall: Bebop Starburst
Matthew Shipp: Expansion, Power, Release
Misha Mengelberg: Solo
Marilyn Crispell: ⋅Red
Marilyn Crispell: Blue
Evan Parker: After Appleby
Joshua Redman: Beyond
Maybe Monday: Saturn's Finger
Richard Lee Johnson: Fingertip Ship (Metro Blue)

Deaths

 January
 6 – Michel Petrucciani, French pianist and composer (born 1962).
 7 – Fred Hopkins, American upright bassist (born 1947).

 February
 1 – Julius Wechter, American vibraphonist and composer (born 1935).
 5 – Colin Purbrook, English pianist, upright bassist, and trumpeter (born 1936).
 6 – Jimmy Roberts, American singer (born 1923).
 8 – Richard B. Boone, American jazz musician, trombonist, and vocalist (born 1930).
 7 – Bobby Troup, American pianist and songwriter (born 1918).
 11 – Jaki Byard, American jazz pianist and composer who also played trumpet and saxophone (born 1922).
 16 – Betty Roché, American singer (born 1918).
 19
 Lauderic Caton, Trinidadian guitarist (born 1910).
 Trudy Desmond, Canadian singer (born 1945).
 27 – Horace Tapscott, American pianist and composer (born 1934).

 March
 3 – John Roache, American pianist and composer of Ragtime (born 1940).
 4 – Teddy McRae, American tenor saxophonist and arranger (born 1908).
 12 – Yehudi Menuhin, Russian Jewish American violinist and conductor (born 1916).
 22 – Rick Fay, American clarinetist and saxophonist (born 1926).
 29 – Joe Williams, American vocalist (born 1918).

 April
 1 – Jesse Stone, American pianist and songwriter (born 1901).
 3 – Herman Foster, American pianist (born 1928).
 6 – Red Norvo, American vibraphonist (born 1908).
 21 – Charles Rogers, American film actor and musician (born 1904).
 23 – Melba Liston, American trombonist, composer, and musical arranger (born 1926).
 27 – Al Hirt, American trumpeter and bandleader (born 1922).

 May
 8 – Leon Thomas, American avant-garde jazz singer (born 1937).
 18 – Freddy Randall, English jazz trumpeter and bandleader (born 1921).
 19 – Candy Candido, American bassist and vocalist (born 1913).

June
 2 – Andy Simpkins, American bassist (born 1932).
 5
 Ernie Wilkins, American tenor saxophonist (born 1922).
 Mel Tormé, American singer (born 1925).
 8 – Rosy McHargue, American clarinetist (born 1902).
 15 – Fausto Papetti, Italian alto saxophonist (born 1923).

 July
 9 – Talib Dawud, American trumpeter (born 1923).
 11 – Helen Forrest, American singer (born 1917).
 22 – Gar Samuelson, American drummer (born 1958).
 27 – Sweets Edison, American trumpeter (born 1915).

 August
 3 – Leroy Vinnegar, American bassist (born 1928).
 24 – Warren Covington, American trombonist (born 1921).
 25 – Spiegle Willcox, American trombonist (born 1903).

 September
 6 – Arnold Fishkind, American bassist (born 1919).
 8 – Moondog, American musician, composer, theoretician, poet and inventor (born 1916).
 30 – Anna Mae Winburn, African-American vocalist and bandleader (born 1913).

 October
 2 – Sal Salvador, American bebop jazz guitarist and a prominent music educator (born 1925).
 4 – Art Farmer, American trumpeter and flugelhorn player (born 1928).
 8 – Manfredo Fest, Brazilian pianist and keyboardist (born 1936).
 9 – Milt Jackson, American vibraphonist (born 1923).
 18 – Tony Crombie, English jazz drummer, pianist, bandleader, and composer (born 1925).
 21 – LaMont Johnson, American pianist who played in the hard bop and post-bop genres (born 1941).
 31 – Wyatt Ruther, American upright bassist (born 1923).

 November
 8 – Lester Bowie, American trumpet player and composer (born 1941).
 13
 John Benson Brooks, American jazz pianist, songwriter, arranger, and composer (born 1917).
 Donald Mills, American singer, The Mills Brothers (born 1915).
 26
 Clifford Jarvis, American hard bop and free jazz drummer (born 1941).
 Henry Nemo, American musician, songwriter, and actor (born 1909).
 30 – Don "Sugarcane" Harris, American violinist (born 1938).

 December
 2 – Charlie Byrd, American guitarist (born 1925).
 4 – Edward Vesala, Finnish avant-garde jazz composer, bandleader and drummer (born 1945).
 7 – Kenny Baker, English trumpeter, cornetist, flugelhornist, and composer (born 1921).
 11 – Charles Earland, American jazz composer, organist and saxophonist in the soul jazz idiom (born 1941).
 14 – Walt Levinsky, American big band and orchestral player, composer, arranger, and band leader (born 1929).
 17 – Grover Washington Jr., American saxophonist (born 1943).
 26 – Curtis Mayfield, American singer and songwriter (born 1942).
 28 – Terry Rosen, American guitarist, concert promoter and radio DJ (born 1939).
 30 – Sam Ranelli, American drummer (born 1920).

Births

 October
 3 – Tom Ibarra, French guitarist and composer.

See also

1990s in jazz
 List of years in jazz
1999 in music

References

Jazz
Jazz by year